Secret Lives of Women is a reality television series airing Tuesday nights at 10 PM Eastern Time on WE: Women's Entertainment. The show probes little-known subcultures of women in the United States. A typical format is a series of interviews conducted with several women (and occasionally transgender women).

Season 1 (2005)
 Transsexuals
 Shopaholic
 Plastic Surgery Addicts
 Eating Disorders
 Forensic Investigators
 Women In Porn
 Surgeons
 Late In Life Lesbians
 Sex Trade

Season 2 (2006)
 Cutters
 Women Who Love Bad Men
 Married To Cross Dressers
 Fetishes
 Robbing The Cradle
 Swingers
 Plastic Surgery Addicts 2
 Meth Addicts

Season 3 (2007)
 Polygamy
 Munchausen Moms
 Black Widow Women
 Phone Sex Operators
 Lipstick Lesbians
 Cougars
 Sex For Sale
 Cheaters
 Obsessive Compulsives
 Shoplifters

Season 4 (2008)
 Fetishes and Fantasies
 Sideshow Gals
 Exposed: Sexual Predators
 Amazon Women
 Polygamy Cult
 Psychics
 Mafia Women
 Husband Beaters
 Voyeurs and Exhibitionists
 Stalkers
 Girl Gangs
 Porn Stars
 Size Matters: Tall, Small, and Extra Large
 Dirty Little Suburban Secrets
 Eating Disorders
 Child Brides
 Mistresses
 Open Relationships
 Unexpected Love
 Extreme Body Modifications
 Extreme Weight Loss
 Extreme Beliefs
 Extreme Plastic Surgery
 Specialty Models
 Phobias
 The Occult
 Sex Addicts

Season 5 (2009)
 Mothers of Murderers
 Extreme Diets
 Cults
 Nasty Divorces
 Women of Erotica
 Mini Women
 Shopping Addicts

See also
 2005 in television

References

External links
 

2005 American television series debuts
2000s American reality television series
Television series by CBS Studios
CBS News
History of women in the United States